Snipes–Fox House is a historic home located at Siler City, Chatham County, North Carolina.  It was built about 1900, and is a two-story, three bay Late Victorian style frame dwelling.  It features an expansive wrap-around porch and unique interior woodwork.  Also on the property is a contributing frame front-gabled smokehouse.

It was listed on the National Register of Historic Places in 1998.

References

Houses on the National Register of Historic Places in North Carolina
Victorian architecture in North Carolina
Houses completed in 1900
Houses in Chatham County, North Carolina
National Register of Historic Places in Chatham County, North Carolina